Elliott Northcott (April 26, 1869 – January 3, 1946) was a United States circuit judge of the United States Court of Appeals for the Fourth Circuit.

Education and career

Born in Clarksburg, West Virginia, Northcott attended the University of Michigan Law School, but read law to enter the bar in 1891. He entered private practice in West Virginia in 1891. He married Lola Beardsley in 1893. He was city attorney of Huntington, West Virginia from 1897 to 1898, and was then an Assistant United States Attorney of the Southern District of West Virginia from 1898 to 1905, and the United States Attorney for that district from 1905 to 1909. He was United States Envoy Extraordinary and Minister Plenipotentiary to Colombia from 1909 to 1911, to Nicaragua in 1911, and to Venezuela from 1911 to 1913. He returned to private practice in West Virginia from 1915 to 1922, and was again the United States Attorney for the Southern District of West Virginia from 1922 to 1927.

Federal judicial service

Northcott received a recess appointment from President Calvin Coolidge on April 6, 1927, to a seat on the United States Court of Appeals for the Fourth Circuit vacated by Judge John Carter Rose. He was nominated to the same position by President Coolidge on December 6, 1927. He was confirmed by the United States Senate on December 15, 1927, and received his commission the same day. He assumed senior status on October 15, 1939. His service terminated on January 3, 1946, due to his death in Arcadia, Florida.

References

Sources
 

1869 births
1946 deaths
Judges of the United States Court of Appeals for the Fourth Circuit
United States court of appeals judges appointed by Calvin Coolidge
20th-century American judges
Lawyers from Clarksburg, West Virginia
West Virginia lawyers
West Virginia city attorneys
University of Michigan Law School alumni
Ambassadors of the United States to Colombia
United States federal judges admitted to the practice of law by reading law
United States Attorneys for the Southern District of West Virginia
Assistant United States Attorneys